Strange Wilderness is a 2008 American comedy-adventure film produced by Adam Sandler's production company Happy Madison Productions for Paramount Pictures, directed by Fred Wolf (who co-wrote the film with Peter Gaulke), and starring Steve Zahn, Allen Covert, Jonah Hill, Kevin Heffernan, Ashley Scott, Peter Dante, Harry Hamlin, Robert Patrick, Joe Don Baker, Justin Long, Jeff Garlin, and Ernest Borgnine. It tells the story about the crew members of the titular nature show heading to Ecuador to investigate a Bigfoot sighting in order to keep the show from being cancelled. The film received negative reviews and was a box office bomb, making less than $7 million against a $20 million budget.

Plot
Peter Gaulke is the host of an unsuccessful nature program called Strange Wilderness which was originally hosted by Peter's late father.

One day, Peter and his sidekick/soundman Fred Wolf are told by network head Ed Lawson about the negative aspects of Strange Wilderness since the death of Peter's father like low ratings, poor content, inappropriate footage, referring to all indigenous peoples as pygmies aside from the littering, and bad things happening to people in footage like an alligator attack on someone and a guy at a peace rally who was on fire. Unless something big happens, Strange Wilderness will be cancelled in two weeks.

Peter brainstorms ideas to keep Strange Wilderness on the air with Fred, equipment manager Lynn Cooker, driver Danny Gutierrez, camera man Junior, and his father's old friend/original cameraman Milas. Bill Calhoun, his dad's friend, brings him photos of Bigfoot hiding in Ecuador and a map to his cave. Sky Pierson, the host of a more successful wildlife show, has offered $1,000 for the map. Unable to pay this, Peter tells Bill that he will have it in a week at his mountain cabin.

Peter, Fred, Lynn, Danny, and Junior start preparing for the long trip. They also bring in two more people like Whitaker, a former car mechanic now animal handler, and Cheryl, a travel agent.

Stopping to shoot footage of sea lions, Danny dresses up as a seal for better angles, gets attacked by a shark, and ends up hospitalized. Outside the hospital, Peter and Fred get into trouble with a local gang, get their front teeth knocked out, and have to go to a dentist. These incidents cause more funds being drained.

They arrive at Bill's cabin only to learn he already sold the map to Pierson. However, Bill makes a copy of the map from security cameras. He also enlists the help of renowned tracker Gus Hayden, but they are unable to pay him. While urinating in the bushes, Peter is attacked by a mother turkey, ending up with his penis inside its mouth. They rush him to a hospital to remove it from his penis. A wildlife ranger and a conservationist that "own" the turkey stop the doctor from cutting the turkey's head off, offering a $5,000 reward for the bird's return.

Continuing their journey, they eventually reach Ecuador. There, they meet up with Dick, an explorer and a friend of Bill who takes them to Gus Hayden.

The next morning however, they wake up to find that Gus has left, stolen their equipment, and Cheryl is missing. Though hesitant and with Peter not willing to give up, Dick agrees to lead the group through the jungle. During the night, Cheryl catches up with them and explains she saw Gus stealing their equipment and pretended to run off with him so she could get the map back.

The next day while crossing the river, Dick is attacked and eaten by piranhas. Coming across Pierson's camp, they find he and his team have been killed by local pygmies. The group then gathers the equipment and eventually reach Bigfoot's cave. While filming, a confused Bigfoot steps out and gets gunned down by the scared group. Not sure how to end the show in a good way later that night, Cooker comes up with the idea of showing Bigfoot committing suicide.

The surviving members return to the studio to show Lawson their footage where they tried to resuscitate Bigfoot. Lawson berates them for their ridiculousness and cancels Strange Wilderness. This leads to a fight within the group.

One year later, Peter gets a visit from Milas who encourages him to revive Strange Wilderness. Peter gets everyone back together and they make an episode about the shark attack using footage of them vomiting into the shark's mouth at the scene of the incident as well as Danny getting his arm bitten by that shark. Peter and Fred show it to Lawson. Impressed with the footage, Lawson states to Pete that people love shark attacks. With Pierson dead, Lawson puts Strange Wilderness back on the air.

A postscript states that Strange Wilderness became successful again and dominated the 3:00 AM slot. Six months later, Peter's group went searching for the Loch Ness Monster where hilarity occurred in Scotland. They remain friends to this day.

Cast
 Steve Zahn as Peter Gaulke, the host of Strange Wilderness.
 Allen Covert as Fred Wolf, the soundman for Strange Wilderness and Peter's sidekick.
 Jonah Hill as Lynn Cooker, the equipment manager for Strange Wilderness.
 Kevin Heffernan as Whitaker, a former car mechanic that becomes the animal handler for Strange Wilderness.
 Ashley Scott as Cheryl, a travel agent that gets involved with Strange Wilderness.
 Peter Dante as Danny Gutierrez, an RV driver.
 Harry Hamlin as Sky Pierson, the host of a rival nature TV show.
 Robert Patrick as Gus Hayden, an animal tracker.
 Joe Don Baker as Bill Calhoun, an old friend of Peter's father.
 Justin Long as Junior, a camera man for Strange Wilderness.
 Jeff Garlin as Ed Lawson, the head of the TV studio K-Pip that broadcasts Strange Wilderness.
 Ernest Borgnine as Milas, an old friend of Peter's dad and the original camera man on Strange Wilderness.
 John Farley as a mountain doctor
 Oliver Hudson as TJ, an animal handler.
 Blake Clark as Dick, an explorer who is friends with Gus.
 Seth Rogen as the voice of a ranger in a helicopter
 Kevin Alejandro as Hispanic Man #1
 Jake Abel as conservationist
 Jim Meskimen as Park Ranger Don, a park ranger who interrupts one of Peter's filming activities for Strange Wilderness because he did not have a permit to film in the forest.
 David Mattey as Bigfoot, a Cryptid that was sighted in Ecuador.
 Jennifer Perks as Debra
 Meg Wolf as Judy, a K-Pip receptionist.
 Molly Wolf as Little Girl
 Bill Burrud as Peter Gaulke's father (archive footage)

Reception

Strange Wilderness received highly negative reviews. Rotten Tomatoes gave it a 2% approval rating, based on 48 reviews with an average rating of 2.7/10. The website's critical consensus reads, "Strange Wilderness is a laugh-free comedy that's both aimless and overly crass."  On Metacritic, it has a weighted average score of 12 out 100 based on 12 reviews, indicating "overwhelming dislike". It is in 42nd place on the Metacritic list of the worst-reviewed films ever (with seven or more reviews).

References

External links
 
 
 
 
 

2008 films
2000s adventure comedy films
American adventure comedy films
American buddy films
2000s English-language films
Films directed by Fred Wolf
Films with screenplays by Fred Wolf
Films shot in Los Angeles
Happy Madison Productions films
Paramount Pictures films
Bigfoot films
Fictional television shows
2008 directorial debut films
Films set in Ecuador
Films about shark attacks
2008 comedy films
2000s American films